"Hold Me" is a song by Australian musical duo Savage Garden, released as the sixth overall single from their second studio album, Affirmation. Released in the United Kingdom in November 2000 and in Australia in January 2001, the single reached number 54 in Australia and became a top-20 hit in New Zealand and the United Kingdom. The music video features Darren walking around Borough Market, and streets in South London, whilst trucks drive in and out of them.

Song meaning
In a video posted on the band's Facebook page on 21 June 2015, singer Darren Hayes explained that "Hold Me" had been written about a marriage breaking down.

Track listing

United Kingdom
CD1
 "Hold Me" (radio version) – 3:54
 "Crash and Burn" (Live in the Studio) – 4:08
 "Truly Madly Deeply" (Australian version) – 4:38

CD2
 "Hold Me" (radio version) – 3:54
 "I Want You" (live acoustic) – 2:48
 "I Knew I Loved You" (live in Brisbane, May 2000) – 3:26

Cassette
 "Hold Me" (radio version) – 3:54
 "Truly Madly Deeply" (Australian version) – 4:38

Europe
Single CD
 "Hold Me" (radio version) – 3:54
 "Truly Madly Deeply" (Australian version) – 4:38

Maxi-CD
 "Hold Me" (radio version) – 3:54
 "Truly Madly Deeply" (Australian version) – 4:38
 "I Want You" (live acoustic) – 2:48
 "I Knew I Loved You" (live in Brisbane, May 2000) – 3:26

Australia
 "Hold Me" – 4:50
 "Hold Me" (live in Brisbane, May 2000) – 5:10
 "The Best Thing" (live in Brisbane, May 2000) – 5:29
 "Affirmation" (Almighty Remix) – 8:04

New Zealand
 "Hold Me" (radio version) – 3:54
 "Crash and Burn" (live in the Studio) – 4:08
 "I Want You" (live acoustic) – 2:48
 "I Knew I Loved You" (live in Brisbane, May 2000) – 3:26

Charts

Release history

References

1999 songs
2000 singles
APRA Award winners
Columbia Records singles
Music videos directed by Alek Keshishian
Savage Garden songs
Song recordings produced by Walter Afanasieff
Songs written by Daniel Jones (musician)
Songs written by Darren Hayes
Warner Music Group singles